Medshi is a small town in Washim district in the Indian state of Maharashtra. It is situated on the bank of the Morna river, close to the Urdhav Morna Prakalpa dam, along State Highway 204.

Notable Locations and Events 
Medshi is home to Dagh, a famous temple dedicated to Lord Shiva. Medshi also hosts a local fair each January, the Khandoba Yatra.

Politics 
Prior to the delimitation of legislative assembly constituencies in 2008, Medshi was the constituency number 113 of Maharashtra Legislative Assembly between 1977-2004.

References

Cities and towns in Washim district